The  pitch angle of a charged particle is the angle between the particle's velocity vector and the local magnetic field.  This is a common measurement and topic when studying the magnetosphere, magnetic mirrors, biconic cusps and polywells. See Aurora and Ring current

Usage: particle motion
It is customary to discuss the direction a particle is heading by its pitch angle.  A pitch angle of 0 degrees is a particle whose parallel motion is perfectly along the local magnetic field.  In the northern hemisphere this particle would be heading down toward the Earth (and the opposite in the southern hemisphere).  A pitch angle of 90 degrees is a particle that is locally mirroring (see: Magnetosphere particle motion).

Special case: equatorial pitch angle
The equatorial pitch angle of a particle is the pitch angle of the particle at the Earth's geomagnetic equator.  This angle defines the loss cone of a particle.  The loss cone is the set of angles where the particle will strike the atmosphere and no longer be trapped in the magnetosphere while particles with pitch angles outside the loss cone will mirror and continue to be trapped.  

Notice that this is independent of charge, mass, or kinetic energy.

This is due to the invariance of the magnetic moment  . At the point of reflection, the particle has zero parallel velocity or a pitch angle of 90 degrees. As a result,

See also
 Adiabatic invariant
 Magnetic mirror

External links
Oulu Space Physics Textbook
IMAGE mission glossary

Electromagnetism